Sławęcin may refer to the following places in Poland:
Sławęcin, Lower Silesian Voivodeship (south-west Poland)
Sławęcin, Inowrocław County in Kuyavian-Pomeranian Voivodeship (north-central Poland)
Sławęcin, Gmina Chodecz in Kuyavian-Pomeranian Voivodeship (north-central Poland)
Sławęcin, Gmina Lubień Kujawski in Kuyavian-Pomeranian Voivodeship (north-central Poland)
Sławęcin, Łódź Voivodeship (central Poland)
Sławęcin, Lublin Voivodeship (east Poland)
Sławęcin, Subcarpathian Voivodeship (south-east Poland)
Sławęcin, Masovian Voivodeship (east-central Poland)
Sławęcin, Pomeranian Voivodeship (north Poland)
Sławęcin, Choszczno County in West Pomeranian Voivodeship (north-west Poland)
Sławęcin, Szczecinek County in West Pomeranian Voivodeship (north-west Poland)